iF-16 is a 1997 video game developed by Digital Integration and published by Interactive Magic.

Reception

Computer Gaming World gave the game a score of 2.5 out of 5 stating "iF-16 is essentially a marriage of the most often simulated combat aircraft in history with a slightly tweaked version of the APACHE/HIND engine. It brings almost nothing new to the table"

See also
iF-22
iF/A-18E Carrier Strike Fighter

References

Combat flight simulators
1997 video games